The al-Dawayima massacre describes the killing of civilians by the Israeli army (IDF) that took place in the Palestinian Arab town of al-Dawayima on October 29, 1948, during the 1948 Arab–Israeli War. The incident occurred after the town was occupied by the IDF's 89th Commando Battalion during Operation Yoav, encountering little resistance. The battalion was composed of former Irgun and Lehi forces.

Benny Morris has estimated that hundreds of people were killed. Lieutenant-General John Bagot Glubb, the British commander of Jordan's Arab Legion stated the numbers were much smaller, citing  a UN report for a figure of 30 women and children killed. A follow-up report delivered to the United Nations by a delegation from the Arab Refugee Congress reported that the Arab Legion had had an interest in underplaying the extent of the massacre, which was, it claimed,  worse than the Deir Yassin massacre, in order to avoid further panic and refugee flight. The village mukhtar Hassan Mahmoud Ihdeib, in a sworn statement, estimated the number of victims as 145.

Background
Al-Dawayima's core clan, the Ahdibs, traced their ancestry to the conquest of Palestine by Umar ibn Khattab in the 7th century. At the time, it had a population of 6,000 since some 4,000 Palestinian Arab refugees had taken refuge in the village prior to the massacre. The Haganah intelligence service (HIS) considered the village to be 'very friendly'. Dawayima was situated a few kilometres west of Hebron.

Witness accounts

The village mukhtar's account
According to the village headman, Hassan Mahmoud Ihdeib, half an hour after midday prayers, the village was approached from three groups of troops, from the West, North and South: 20 armoured cars on the Qubeiba-Dawaymeh road, a second group along the Beit Jibrin-Dawaymeh road, and another set of  armoured cars approaching from Mafkhar-Dawaymeh. He stated that no call to surrender was announced, and that no resistance took place. Firing began  at a distance of 1/2 kilometer as the semi-circular arc of forces closed in. The Israeli troops fired indiscriminately for over an hour, during which time many fled, and two Palestinian groups took refuge respectively in the Mosque and a nearby cave called Iraq El Zagh. On returning the day with other villagers, 60 bodies were found in the mosque, mostly of elderly men. Numerous corpses of men, women and children, lay in the streets. 80 bodies of men, women and children were then found in the entrance of the Iraq El Zagh cavern. On making a census, it emerged that 455 persons were missing, 280 men, and the remainder women and children.

The event according to Benny Morris

The letter by Kaplan was published in full in Haaretz in February 2016. The original of the letter was removed from the archive where it has previously been available.

Benny Morris writes:

The soldier-witness, according to Kaplan, said

From the sworn Statement given by the Mukhtar of Dawaymeh village, Hassan Mahmaod Ihdeib.

Morris has estimated "hundreds" of people were killed, he also reports on the IDF investigation, which concluded around 100 villagers had been killed, and cites an account by a Mapam member, based on an interview with an Israeli soldier, who reported 80 to 100 men, women and children killed. Saleh Abdel Jawad evaluates the total to "between 100 and 200".

Further details according to Ilan Pappe
Ilan Pappe states that the village was guarded by 20 men who were paralysed by fright when they saw the Israeli troops, and that the semi-circular pincer movement was designed to allow the 6,000 residents the possibility of fleeing eastwards. The massacre took place when the expected wave of flight failed to take place. He also adds that Amos Kenan, who had participated in the Deir Yassin massacre, took part in the assault.

The UN inspection team

Yigal Allon cabled Général Yitzhak Sadeh to check "the 'rumours' that the 89th Battalion had 'killed many tens of prisoners on the day of the conquest of al-Dawayima', and to respond". On the 5 November, probably worried about a UN investigation, Allon then ordered Sadeh to instruct the unit:

Although unbeknownst to Allon, the 89th had cleaned up the site of the massacre on 1 November 1948.

On 7 November, UN inspectors visited the scene of the village to investigate accusations of a massacre, the accusation being made by the Egyptians and refugees from the village. The team found "several demolished buildings and one corpse but no other physical evidence of a massacre". The UN team did however take a witness statement from the village mukhtar

In a November 8, 1948, letter to Alexander Cadogan of the United Kingdom, as then-president of the UN Security Council, the Israeli government denied any massacre had occurred in the village. Aubrey S. Eban, Israel's representative at the United Nations, claimed Al-Dawayima "had been completely abandoned by its civilian population before it was occupied by Israeli forces in the operations which followed the Egyptian truce violation on October 14th." Eban further claimed none of the "atrocity stories" reported by the Arab League concerning Israeli conduct "has proved to have had the least substance or foundation."  

Isser Be'eri, the commander of the IDF intelligence service, who conducted an independent investigation, concluded that 80 people had been killed during the occupation of Al-Dawayima and that 22 had been captured and executed subsequently. Be'eri recommended prosecution of the platoon OC, who had confessed to the massacre, but notwithstanding his recommendations no one was put on trial or punished.

On 14 November the Israeli cabinet instructed Prime Minister David Ben-Gurion to also launch an investigation. Its findings remain secret.

Reactions
The American consul in Jerusalem, William Burdett, who had received news about the massacre reported on November 16 to Washington "Investigation by UN indicates massacre occurred but observers are unable to determine number of persons involved."

News of the massacre reached village communities in the western Hebron and Judean foothills "possibly precipitating further flight".

However,

See also
 Killings and massacres during the 1948 Palestine war
 1948 Palestinian exodus

References

Bibliography

Benvenisti, Meron (2002). Sacred Landscape: The Buried History of the Holy Land Since 1948. University of California Press. 
Morris, Benny (2004). The Birth of the Palestinian Refugee Problem Revisited. Cambridge: Cambridge University Press. 
Khalidi, Walid (1991). "ALL THAT REMAINS: The Palestinian Villages Occupied and Depopulated by Israel in 1948", The Institute of Palestine Studies, Washington, D.C. 

Massacres in Mandatory Palestine
Wartime sexual violence
October 1948 events in Asia
Zionist terrorism
1948 massacres of Palestinians